Tal Menashe (lit. Dew of Manasseh) is an Israeli outpost in the West Bank, retroactively legalized under Israeli law as an extension (suburb) of the Israeli settlement of Hinanit, located in the Samarian hills on the northwestern edge of the West Bank. The outpost, under the administrative municipal government of the Shomron Regional Council, is adjacent to Hinanit and Shaked. It was founded in 1992 as an Israeli outpost next to the settlement of Hinanit, and moved to it final land at 1999 on state lands nearby. It was founded by a group of Israelis from a kollel in Mevaseret Zion and from the Technion in Haifa. 

The international community considers Israeli settlements in the West Bank illegal under international law, but the Israeli government disputes this.

History
It is named after the Biblical miracle of the dew, which Gideon experienced in this area (Judges 6:35-40), since it is located on land allotted to the Tribe of Manasseh. It is the only Orthodox Jewish settlement in the northern West Bank since other communities were destroyed as a result of Israel's unilateral disengagement plan.
The chief rabbi is Reuven Uziel who also serves as the main rabbi of the northern West Bank settlements.

In January 2021, Prime Minister Benjamin Netanyahu announced that Tal Menashe would be among the West Bank communities slated to have new homes constructed, along with Bet El, Givat Zeev, Rehelim, Shavei Shomron, Barkan and Karnei Shomron.

Gallery

References

External links

http://www.tal-menashe.info/ 

Religious Israeli settlements
Populated places established in 1999
1999 establishments in the Palestinian territories
Israeli settlements in the West Bank